Ever Dawn Carradine is an American actress. She is known for her roles as Tiffany Porter and Kelly Ludlow on the ABC television series Once and Again and Commander in Chief, and as Naomi Putnam and Janet Stein on the Hulu original series The Handmaid's Tale and Runaways, respectively.

Early life and education
 
Carradine was born in Los Angeles the daughter of Susan Snyder, a horse trainer's assistant, and actor Robert Carradine. She has two half-siblings, Marika Reed Carradine and Ian Alexander Carradine. A number of other members of the Carradine family are also actors, including her grandfather John Carradine, and uncles Keith Carradine and David Carradine. She is also a cousin of Martha Plimpton.

Career
After graduating from Lewis & Clark in 1996, she returned to Los Angeles and appeared in several television shows including Diagnosis: Murder, Tracey Takes On..., and The Sentinel. In 1998, she received her first recurring guest role as Rosalie, a love interest on Party of Five. She appeared as Pepper, a ditzy assistant on Veronica's Closet. In 2003, she got her first regular series role on Lucky, an FX drama about a professional poker player living in Las Vegas.

She starred in the film Dead & Breakfast and has appeared in films including Bubble Boy, Jay and Silent Bob Strike Back, and Lucky 13. She appeared on the show Once and Again from 2001 to 2002, and on Commander in Chief from 2005 to 2006. She has had recurring guest roles on the shows Major Crimes (as Rusty's biological mother), Veronica's Closet, Party of Five, and Women's Murder Club. She has also appeared in television shows such as House, Law & Order: Criminal Intent, CSI, Will & Grace, Just Shoot Me!, and 24.

She had recurring roles on the TV series Eureka, and on Showtime's Shameless. Carradine also guested on an episode of Rizzoli & Isles.  She appeared in the first season of the Amazon series Goliath, portrayed Linda on the television show Code Black, and since 2017 has played Naomi Putnam on the Hulu series The Handmaid's Tale. Since 2017, she has also been a series regular on Runaways playing the role of Janet Stein.

Personal life 
Carradine and her husband Coby Brown have a daughter, Chaplin Haddow Brown.

Filmography

Film

Television

References

External links
 
 

20th-century American actresses
21st-century American actresses
Actresses from Los Angeles
American film actresses
Carradine family
American television actresses
Lewis & Clark College alumni
Living people
Waldorf school alumni
Year of birth missing (living people)